Vespina nielseni is a moth of the family Incurvariidae. It is found in Japan (Hokkaido, Honshu, Shikoku, Kyushu) and the Russian Far East.

The wingspan is 8–11 mm. The forewings are narrow and brown to ochre in colour.

The larvae feed on the leaves of Quercus aliena, Quercus serrata and Quercus acutissima.

References

Moths described in 1987
Incurvariidae
Moths of Japan